Bertha is a female Germanic name, from Old High German berhta meaning "bright one". It was usually a short form of Anglo Saxon names Beorhtgifu meaning "bright gift" or Beorhtwynn meaning "bright joy". 

The name occurs as a theonym, surviving as  Berchta, a figure in Alpine folklore connected to the Wild Hunt, probably an epithet of *Frijjō in origin.

Bertha appears as a Frankish given name from as early as the 6th century.
The monothematic Bertha  as a given name may, however, not originate with the theonym but rather as a short form of dithematic given names including the "bright" element. 
This is notably the case with the mother of Charlemagne, Bertrada (properly berht-rada "bright counsel") called "Bertha Broadfoot." Carolingian uses of the name Bertha, as in the case of Bertha, daughter of Charlemagne and Bertha, daughter of Lothair II, are in this tradition.

In modern times, the name is associated with an unusually large example of a class of objects. Many large machines are nicknamed Bertha for the World War I howitzer known as Big Bertha.

Women named Bertha include:
 Saint Bertha of Kent (539 – c. 612), Queen of Kent
 Saint Bertha of Val d'Or (d. c. 690), abbess
 Saint Bertha of Artois (mid-7th century – 4 July 725), abbess, daughter of Count Rigobert and Ursana
 Bertrada of Laon (also called Bertha with the big feet) (720–783), Frankish queen
 Saint Bertha of Bingen (fl. c. 757), mother of Saint Rupert of Bingen
 Bertha, daughter of Charlemagne (c. 780 – after 11 March 824) 
 Bertha, daughter of Lothair II (863–925)
 Blessed Bertha de Bardi, Florence; (died 24 March 1163)
 Bertha, Duchess of Brittany (c. 1114 – 1156)
 Bertha of Burgundy (952, 964 or 967 – 1010, 16 January 1016, or 1035), queen of France
 Bertha of Hereford (born c. 1130), heiress
 Bertha of Holland (c. 1055 – 1093), queen of France
 Bertha of Putelendorf (died 1190), Saxon noble
 Bertha of Savoy (1051–1087)
 Bertha of Sulzbach (1110–1159), Byzantine empress
 Bertha of Swabia (c. 907 – 966), queen of Burgundy
 Bertha of Val d'Or (died c. 690), a Christian saint
 Bertha Benz (1849–1944), wife of automobile inventor Karl Benz and the first person in history to drive an automobile over long distance. 
 Bertha Southey Brammall (1878–1957), Australian writer
 Bertha Brainard (1890–1946), pioneering television executive
 Bertha Coombs (born 1961), reporter
 Bertha Díaz (born 1936), Cuban track and field athlete
 Bertha Fowler (1866-1952), American educator, preacher, deaconess
 Bertha Gifford (1871-1951), American serial killer
 Bertha Lund Glaeser (1862-1939), American physician
 Bertha Gxowa (1934-2010), South African anti-apartheid activist, trade unionist, and women's rights activist
 Bertha Hart, American mathematician 
 Bertha "Chippie" Hill (1905–1950), American blues and vaudeville singer and dancer
 Bertha von Hillern (born 1857), American athlete and painter
 Bertha Hosang Mah (1896 – 1959), Canadian student
 Bertha Kalich (1874–1939), Jewish actress
 Bertha Krupp (1886–1957), sole proprietor of the Krupp industrial empire from 1902 to 1943
 Bertha Knight Landes (1868–1943), first female mayor of a major American city (Seattle, Washington)
 Bertha Lewis (1887–1931), English opera singer and actress
 Bertha Mahony (1882–1969), publisher of children's literature
 Bertha Palmer (1849–1918), American businesswoman, socialite, and philanthropist
 Bertha Pappenheim (1859–1936), Austrian-Jewish feminist and social pioneer
 Bertha Lee Pate (1903–1975), American blues vocalist
Bertha Quinn (1873–1951), British suffragette and socialist, recipient of Papal Medal
 Bertha Ronge (1818–1863), Anglo-German kindergarten activist
 Bertha Runkle (1879–1958), American novelist and playwright
 Bertha Sánchez (born 1978), Colombian long-distance runner
 Bertha Schrader (1845-1920), German painter, lithographer, and woodblock print-maker
 Bertha von Suttner (1843–1914), Austrian novelist and pacifist
 Bertha Swirles (1903–1999), English physicist and applied mathematician
 Bertha Tammelin, (1836–1915), Swedish musician, composer and singer
 Bertha Teague (1906–1991), Hall of Fame basketball coach
 Bertha Townsend (1869–1909), American tennis player
 Bertha L. Turner (1867–1938), American caterer, cookbook author, and community leader
 Bertha Valerius (1824–1895), Swedish photographer 
 Bertha Yerex Whitman (1892–1984), American architect 
 Bertha Wehnert-Beckmann (1815–1901), German photographer
 Bertha Wilson (1923–2007), first female Puisne Justice of the Supreme Court of Canada
 Bertha M. Wilson (1874–1936), American dramatist, critic, actress
 Bertha Zück (1797–1868), German-Swedish royal treasurer

Other uses
 Bertha (disambiguation)
 Big Bertha (disambiguation)

External links
http://www.behindthename.com/name/bertha

Given names
English feminine given names
Surnames
German feminine given names

de:Bertha
it:Bertha
nl:Bertha
pt:Bertha
ru:Берта